The Martyrdom of Saint Maxence (French: Le martyre de Sainte-Maxence) is a 1928 French silent historical drama film directed by Donatien and starring Lucienne Legrand, Thomy Bourdelle and Raoul Chennevières.

Cast
 Lucienne Legrand as Maxence 
 Thomy Bourdelle as Le chef barbare Sartorek 
 Raoul Chennevières as Théobald 
 Berthe Jalabert as Rosébie 
 Pierre Simon as Lucinius 
 Georges Péclet as Michel Brabance 
 Alice Desvergers as Tilda 
 Jean Diéner as Le grand-prêtre 
 Lionel Salem as Hugues Valens 
 Suzanne Talba as La favorite

References

Bibliography
 Rège, Philippe. Encyclopedia of French Film Directors, Volume 1. Scarecrow Press, 2009.

External links

1928 films
Films directed by Émile-Bernard Donatien
French silent feature films
1920s historical drama films
French historical drama films
Films set in the 5th century
French black-and-white films
Martyrdom in fiction
1928 drama films
Silent historical drama films
1920s French films
1920s French-language films